Adam Curtis (born 26 May 1955) is an English documentary filmmaker.

Curtis began his career as a conventional documentary producer for the BBC throughout the 1980s and into the early 1990s. The release of Pandora's Box (1992) marked the introduction of Curtis's distinctive presentation that uses collage to explore aspects of sociology, psychology, philosophy and political history.

His style has been described as involving, "whiplash digressions, menacing atmospherics and arpeggiated scores, and the near-psychedelic compilation of archival footage", narrated by Curtis himself with "patrician economy and assertion". His films have won four BAFTAs.

Early life
Adam Curtis was born in Dartford in Kent, and raised in nearby Platt. His father was Martin Curtis (1917–2002), a cinematographer with a socialist background.

Curtis won a county scholarship and attended the Sevenoaks School. It was there that an influential art teacher introduced him to the work of Robert Rauschenberg.

Curtis completed a Bachelor of Arts degree in human sciences at Mansfield College, Oxford. He began a PhD and taught in politics, but ultimately became disillusioned with academia and decided to leave the profession.

Career

Early career
Curtis applied to the BBC and was hired to make a film for one of its training courses, comparing designer clothes in music videos to the design of weapons. He was subsequently given a post on That's Life!, a magazine series that juxtaposed hard-hitting investigations and light-hearted content. He was a film director on Out of Court, a BBC Two legal series, from 1980 until 1982.

Politics
Curtis is inspired by the sociologist Max Weber, who, he argues, challenged the "crude, left-wing, vulgar Marxism that says that everything happens because of economic forces within society". Of his general political outlook, Curtis has also remarked: 

In a later interview, Curtis has stated:

Documentaries

Curtis cites the U.S.A. trilogy, a series of three novels by John Dos Passos that he first read when he was thirteen, as the greatest influence on his work: 

Other creative influences are Robert Rauschenberg and Émile Zola. Curtis makes extensive use of archive footage in his documentaries. He has acknowledged the influence of recordings made by Erik Durschmied and is "constantly using his stuff in my films".

Discussing his process in an interview with fellow documentary-maker Jon Ronson for Vice, Curtis said his extensive work with footage acquired from the BBC Archives is often led by 'instinct and imagination', with the aim of creating 'a mood that gives power and force to the story I'm telling'.

Instead of specially composed music, which Curtis has said "creates a sort of monoculture", he uses tracks from a variety of genres, decades, and countries, as well as sound effects that he discovers on old tapes.

According to a profile of Curtis by Tim Adams, published in The Observer: "If there has been a theme in Curtis's work ... it has been to look at how different elites have tried to impose an ideology on their times, and the tragicomic consequences of those attempts".

In 2005, Curtis received the Golden Gate Persistence of Vision Award at the San Francisco International Film Festival. In 2006, he was given the Alan Clarke Award for Outstanding Creative Contribution to Television at the British Academy Television Awards. In 2009, the Sheffield International Documentary Festival gave Curtis the Inspiration Award for inspiring viewers and other documentary filmmakers. In 2015, he was awarded the True Vision Award by the True/False Film Fest.

Curtis's critics have accused him of exaggeration and distortion, even wilful misrepresentation.

Blog
Curtis administered a blog subtitled 'The Medium and the Message' hosted by the BBC and updated between 2009 and 2016.

Filmography

References

Further reading

Adam Curtis versus Joshua Oppenheimer, or art times journalism – 2015 article by Robert Greene for the BFI
Adam Curtis: "We don't read newspapers because the journalism is so boring" – 2014 interview by Rob Pollard for New Statesman
On Adam Curtis'– 2011 article by Brian Appleyard for The Sunday Times
Adam Curtis: The TV elite has lost the plot – 2007 interview by Andrew Orlowski for The Register
Adam Curtis's Theory of Everything – 2021 article by Will Fenstermaker for Dissent
The Paranoid Style in Adam Curtis – 2021 article by Sasha Frere-Jones for The New York Review of Books

External links

Sam Knight: Adam Curtis Explains It All, Portrait of Adam Curtis as an Artist, in: The New Yorker January 28, 2021
Adam Curtis. The Medium and the Message – his archived blog at BBC Online (2011–2016)
The Power of Auteurs and the Last Man Standing: Adam Curtis's Documentary Nightmares – extensive commentary on his films at Bright Lights Film Journal
Adam Curtis: The Desperate Edge of Now – details of a 2012 exhibition at the e-flux gallery in New York City

1955 births
20th-century English male writers
20th-century English non-fiction writers
20th-century essayists
21st-century British non-fiction writers
21st-century English male writers
21st-century essayists
Alumni of Mansfield College, Oxford
BAFTA winners (people)
BBC people
British documentary filmmakers
British film directors
British male essayists
British male journalists
British opinion journalists
British social commentators
British television producers
Collage filmmakers
Critics of Islamism
Critics of neoconservatism
Critics of religions
English bloggers
English documentary filmmakers
English essayists
English film directors
English-language film directors
English male journalists
English male non-fiction writers
English social commentators
English television producers
Free speech activists
Living people
Mass media theorists
Media critics
People educated at Sevenoaks School
People from Dartford
Theorists on Western civilization
Writers about activism and social change
Writers about communism
Writers about globalization
Writers about religion and science